{{Infobox animanga/Header
| image     = Cover of the first Japanese volume of Nameless Asterism.jpg
| caption         = First tankōbon volume cover
| ja_kanji        = ななしのアステリズム
| ja_romaji       = Nanashi no Asterism
| genre           = Romance, slice of life, yuri
}}

 is a Japanese yuri manga written and illustrated by Kina Kobayashi. It was serialized online via Square Enix's Gangan Online website from 2015 to 2017, and is licensed for English-language release by Seven Seas Entertainment.

Synopsis
Tsukasa, Nadeshiko, and Mikage have been best friends since they began junior high, however Tsukasa she’s been keeping secret for almost a year; she has a crush on Nadeshiko. Not wanting to disrupt the group, Tsukasa resigns to keep her crush a secret but the situation becomes more complex when she discovers that Nadeshiko actually has a crush on Mikage. Tsukasa struggles with her desire to support her friend as it conflicts with her own feelings. All the while Mikage too has a secret of her own that she can't share with anyone.
 
Characters
Tsukasa Shiratori
 The series protagonist, Tsukasa is a cheerful girl who does not want anything to change in her current friendship group. This has become a problem for her as she has developed a crush on Nadeshiko. She also has a twin brother.

Nadeshiko Washio
 Tsukasa and Mikage's best friend. She is caught by Tsukasa trying to kiss Mikage while she is asleep, revealing that she has a crush on Mikage. Tsukasa promises support her with this crush.

Mikage Kotooka
 Tsukasa and Nadeshiko's best friend. She enjoys making sweets and often bakes treats for Tsukasa and Nadeshiko. She often quickly begins dating and then breaks up with boys to the point of her relationships not being seen as serious by her friends.

Media
Manga

ReceptionNameless Asterism'' generally received positive reviews. Otaku USA recommended the first volume, praising its strong start and noting that "drama arises naturally and nothing feels forced." Anime News Network gave volume's 1 and 2 an overall B+ rating, noting that the series was off to good start and that it really understood its characters and setting, as well as praising the Kina Kobayashi for avoiding melodrama as they "shows a clear understanding of the fact that what seems ridiculous in hindsight at the time is actually of the utmost importance."

In 2019, it was included in the Young Adult Library Services Association's list of "Great Graphic Novels for Teens".

References

External links
 Official English website
 

2010s LGBT literature
2015 manga
Gangan Comics manga
LGBT in anime and manga
Romance anime and manga
Seven Seas Entertainment titles
Slice of life anime and manga
Yuri (genre) anime and manga